Lasaeola is a genus of comb-footed spiders that was first described by Eugène Louis Simon in 1881. The type species was described under the name Pachydactylus pronus, but was renamed Lasaeola prona when it was discovered that the name "Pachydactylus" was preoccupied. Both this genus and Deliana were removed from the synonymy of Dipoena in 1988, but many of these species require more study before their placement is certain.

Species
 it contains twenty-four species and one subspecies, found in the Americas, Europe, and Asia:
Lasaeola algarvensis Wunderlich, 2011 – Portugal
Lasaeola armona Wunderlich, 2015 – Portugal, Spain
Lasaeola atopa (Chamberlin, 1949) – USA
Lasaeola bequaerti (Chickering, 1948) – Panama
Lasaeola canariensis (Wunderlich, 1987) – Canary Is.
Lasaeola convexa (Blackwall, 1870) – Mediterranean
Lasaeola coracina (C. L. Koch, 1837) – Western Europe to Ukraine
Lasaeola dbari Kovblyuk, Marusik & Omelko, 2012 – Georgia
Lasaeola donaldi (Chickering, 1943) – Panama, Venezuela
Lasaeola fastigata Zhang, Liu & Zhang, 2011 – China
Lasaeola flavitarsis (Wunderlich, 1992) – Canary Is.
Lasaeola grancanariensis (Wunderlich, 1987) – Canary Is.
Lasaeola lunata Zhang, Liu & Zhang, 2011 – China
Lasaeola minutissima Wunderlich, 2011 – Portugal, Spain
Lasaeola oceanica Simon, 1883 – Azores
Lasaeola okinawana (Yoshida & Ono, 2000) – China, Japan (Ryukyu Is.)
Lasaeola prona (Menge, 1868) (type) – North America, Europe, Caucasus, Russia (Europe to South Siberia), Kazakhstan, Iran, Japan
Lasaeola spinithorax (Keyserling, 1886) – Peru
Lasaeola striata (Wunderlich, 1987) – Canary Is.
Lasaeola superba (Chickering, 1948) – Mexico, Panama
Lasaeola testaceomarginata Simon, 1881 – Mediterranean
Lasaeola tristis (Hahn, 1833) – Europe, Turkey, Russia (Europe to South Siberia), Central Asia
Lasaeola t. hissariensis (Charitonov, 1951) – Russia (South Siberia)
Lasaeola yona (Yoshida & Ono, 2000) – Japan (Ryukyu Is.)
Lasaeola yoshidai (Ono, 1991) – China, Korea, Japan

In synonymy:
L. daltoni (Levi, 1953, T from Dipoena) = Lasaeola atopa (Chamberlin, 1949)
L. hamata (Tullgren, 1949, T from Dipoena) = Lasaeola prona (Menge, 1868)
L. tibiale (Hahn, 1831, T from Theridion sub nomen dubium) = Lasaeola tristis (Hahn, 1833)
L. trapezoidalis (Levy & Amitai, 1981, T from Dipoena) = Lasaeola convexa (Blackwall, 1870)

See also
 List of Theridiidae species

References

External links

Araneomorphae genera
Spiders of Asia
Spiders of North America
Spiders of South America
Theridiidae